Daye is a city in Hubei, China.

Daye may also refer to:

China
Daye dialect (大冶话), a dialect spoken in Daye
Daye, era name of Emperor Yang of Sui during his reign (605–618)
Daye Group, a geological formation
Ye the Great or Daye (大业), a figure from Chinese mythology
Daye, Cenxi (大业镇), a town in Guangxi, China
Daye, Dengfeng (大冶镇), a town in Henan, China

Surname
Austin Daye (born 1988), American professional basketball player
Buddy Daye, Canadian boxer
Darren Daye (born 1960), American professional basketball player
Daryl Daye (born 1963), American football coach
Gabrielle Daye (1911–2005), British television actress
Irene Daye (1918–1971), American jazz singer
Joseph Daye (born 1990), Australian rules footballer
Pierre Daye (1892–1960), Belgian collaborationist 
Prince Daye (born 1978), Liberian international football striker
Stephen Daye (c. 1594–1668), British North American printer

See also
Day (disambiguation)